Maria "Ria" Thiele (18 March 1904 – 20 April 1996) was a German actress, dancer and choreographer who appeared in theatres of European capitals, including the Deutsches Volkstheater in Vienna and Theater des Westens in Berlin.

Career 
Born in Kleve, Thiele was the daughter of Otto Thiele and his wife Maria, who had six daughters and a son. The family moved to  Düsseldorf-Oberkassel shortly after her birth.

She appeared on stage the same year, for example with Gustaf Gründgens, another student, at the garden restaurant Vossen Links in Oberkassel and on the Düsseldorf stage as a fairy in Shakespeare's Ein Sommernachtstraum.  She made her official debut on 8 June 1920 as Wendla Bergmann in Wedekind's Frühlings Erwachen.

When the Düsseldorfer Schauspielhaus was closed in 1922, Thiele accepted a contract with the Deutsches Volkstheater in Vienna, together with her colleague Eugen Dumont who was 27 years older. Her parents opposed it, and the couple therefore got married. During her time in Vienna, Thiele pursued dancing at the school of Rudolf von Laban. She was particularly successful as Anitra in Ibsens's Peer Gynt, also dancing. She held dance performances.  Max Brod wrote in a review that scenes of gymnastics and dance were added for her, and noted that her well-trained body appeared ingenious and never boring even without dialogue ("Dieser durchtrainierte Körper wirkt auch ohne Dialog geistreich und nie langweilig.")

In 1926, Thiele divorced Dumont and moved to the Theater des Westens in Berlin, where she appeared alongside Willy Fritsch and Willi Forst. In 1929, she played for six months in Prague, where she was a celebrated favourite with the audience ("gefeierter Liebling des Prager Publikums"). A year later, she married Karl Levinger, an entrepreneur from Ulm. She returned to the Düsseldorfer Schauspielhaus three years later.

Under the Nazi regime, Thiele and her husband moved to Alcalá de Henares near Madrid in 1935 where they ran a chicken farm. During the Spanish Civil War, the farm was confiscated and her husband arrested. Thiele escaped to Marseille and further to Vienna, where she was housed by Fritz Wotruba. Her daughter Lydia was born there in 1937. Her husband was free after five months and followed her. When the Gestapo searched for him in 1938, they moved back to Spain. Levinger was traumatised and planned to emigrate to Chile or the United States. When Thiele objected, she was sent to an asylum (Irrenanstalt). She escaped after four weeks. With the help of friends, she managed a new existence as a teacher of dance and gymnastics. She was a choreographer for the Teatro María Guerrero. Karl Levinger took his life in 1946.

Thiele formed her own successful dance company. She had to give up dancing because of a knee injury and appeared as an actress again.

Thiele moved back to Düsseldorf but accepted no acting contracts, although Gründgens, now Intendant of the Düsseldorfer Schauspielhaus, asked her to become a member of the ensemble. She published her memoirs, Und mir wuchsen Flügel, in 1994. She died in Düsseldorf.

In 2011, a street in the new Düsseldorf quarter Belsenpark was named after Ria Thiele.

Publication

References

Cited sources

External links 

 
 
 Thiele, Ria Kalliope

German stage actresses
German female dancers
20th-century German dancers
German women choreographers
1904 births
1996 deaths
20th-century German women